Swank may refer to:

People
 Everett Swank (1913–2000), American basketball player
 Fletcher B. Swank (1875–1950), U.S. Representative from Oklahoma 
 Hilary Swank (born 1974), two-time Academy Award-winning American actress
 Jean Swank, project scientist for NASA
 Michael Swank, American DJ and lead singer for Myka Relocate
 Sam Swank (born 1985), American football player
 Tod Swank, American skateboarder 
 William Swank (born 1940), American sports writer

Others
 Johnny Swank, an Australian a radio comedy serial 
 Swank Motion Pictures, a film distributor and licensor
 Swank Multiple Sclerosis Diet (after Dr. Roy Swank)
 SWANK, the backend of SLIME, an Emacs mode for developing Common Lisp applications
 Swank (magazine), a pornographic magazine